Three Marys are three sandstone pillars in Zion National Park in Washington County, Utah, United States.

Description
The west peak is highest at 6,420-feet elevation, the middle peak is 6,298-feet, and the east peak is lowest, at 6,020-feet. The nearest higher peak is The West Temple,  to the west. Other neighbors include The Sundial, Altar of Sacrifice,  Meridian Tower, Bee Hive, Bridge Mountain, The Watchman, and Mount Kinesava. Precipitation runoff from this mountain drains into the North Fork Virgin River. This feature's name, presumably for The Three Marys, was officially adopted in 1934 by the U.S. Board on Geographic Names.

Climate
Spring and fall are the most favorable seasons to visit this feature. According to the Köppen climate classification system, it is located in a Cold semi-arid climate zone, which is defined by the coldest month having an average mean temperature below 32 °F (0 °C), and at least 50% of the total annual precipitation being received during the spring and summer.

See also

 List of mountains in Utah
 Geology of the Zion and Kolob canyons area
 Colorado Plateau

References

External links
 Zion National Park National Park Service
 National Weather Service Forecast
 The Three Marys rock climbing: Mountainproject.com

Mountains of Utah
Zion National Park
Mountains of Washington County, Utah
Sandstone formations of the United States
Colorado Plateau
Landforms of Washington County, Utah